Atlee Arthur Hunt  (7 November 186419 September 1935) was a senior official in the Australian Public Service. He was appointed Secretary of the Department of External Affairs in 1901, the year of Australia's Federation.

Life and career
Atlee Hunt was born in Fitzroy River, Queensland on 7 November 1864. He was educated at Balmain Public School and Sydney Grammar School. With alcoholic parents, he from an early age assumed effective responsibility for the household.

Hunt began his career at the New South Wales Lands Department in 1879. To study for the Bar, Hunt resigned from the department in 1887. He was admitted to the Bar in 1892 and practiced until late 1900. It was at this time that he forged a rewarding bond with Edmund Barton. An early fruit was his role as assistant counsel in the Proudfoot case, arbitrated by Edmund Barton, in which Hunt obtained a remarkable 2 815 pounds in fees, three times the annual salary of the most senior minister in the New South Wales government.  A more political consequence of Barton's patronage was Hunt's appointment as chief organiser of the "United Federal Executive", which conducted the Yes campaign in the 1899 Federation referendum in New South Wales, on behalf of Barton's protectionists and Reid's free traders.   

In 1901, Hunt was appointed Secretary of the Department of External Affairs, with Barton as his minister.
Hunt's diary entries concerned with Barton as Minister for External Affairs are loyal but far from reverential.  

During Barton's Prime Ministership Hunt assumed the testing task of implementing the often draconian provisions of the Immigration Restriction Act, the legal vehicle of the White Australia Policy. In 1903, when the Petriana grounded on rocks at Portsea Back Beach, he, against all traditions of seafaring, warned its Chinese seamen that if they abandoned their wrecked craft and landed on Australian soil, they risked a 100 pound fine.   He organised a networks of informants to help enforce the Act.

Closely associated with Barton, and later Deakin, Hunt's star dipped as Labor's rose, but he was nevertheless assigned to prepare the Norfolk Island Act 1913, which removed from her inhabitants their last portions of self-rule.  

Hunt died in Perth on 16 September 1935.

Awards
In June 1910 Hunt was appointed a Companions of the Order of St Michael and St George.

Notes

References

1864 births
1935 deaths
Australian public servants
Australian Companions of the Order of St Michael and St George